In Greek mythology, Hyperphas (Ancient Greek: Ὑπέρφαντος) was a leader of the Phlegyans and an ally of the Thebans. He was the father of Euryganeia who, according to Pausanias, married Oedipus after the death of Iocaste; Pausanias also maintains that it was she, and not Iocaste, who bore Oedipus his four children (Eteocles, Polynices, Antigone and Ismene). Defending this version, Pausanias refers to the poem Oedipodea and to a painting by Onasias, which depicted Euryganeia in grief over the conflict between her sons.

According to Hesiod, Hyperphas had another daughter, Euryanassa, who became the mother of Minyas by Poseidon.

Notes

References 

Apollodorus, The Library with an English Translation by Sir James George Frazer, F.B.A., F.R.S. in 2 Volumes, Cambridge, MA, Harvard University Press; London, William Heinemann Ltd. 1921. . Online version at the Perseus Digital Library. Greek text available from the same website.
Pausanias, Description of Greece with an English Translation by W.H.S. Jones, Litt.D., and H.A. Ormerod, M.A., in 4 Volumes. Cambridge, MA, Harvard University Press; London, William Heinemann Ltd. 1918. . Online version at the Perseus Digital Library
 Pausanias, Graeciae Descriptio. 3 vols. Leipzig, Teubner. 1903.  Greek text available at the Perseus Digital Library.

Boeotian characters in Greek mythology